The Karrakatta Plate is a Perth Racing Group 2  Thoroughbred horse race for two-year-olds, run at set weights, over a distance of 1200 metres at Ascot Racecourse, Perth, Western Australia in April. Total prize money is A$500,000.

History
The race is considered the premier two-year-old race during the Perth Racing season calendar.
Originally the race was run in December in the racing calendar but today it is part of the Perth Racing Autumn Carnival.

1953 racebook

Distance
 1900–1971 - 5 furlongs (~1000 metres)
 1972–1979 –  1000 metres
 1980 onwards - 1200 metres

Grade

1900–1978 -  Principal Race
1979–1984 -  Group 2
1985–1998 -  Group 1
1999 onwards -  Group 2

Venue
 In 2005 the race was run at Belmont Park Racecourse.

Winners

 2022 - Amelia's Jewel
 2021 - Ex Sport Man
 2020 - Ima Single Man
 2019 - Dig Deep
 2018 - Valour Road
 2017 - Lucy Mae
 2016 - Whispering Brook
 2015 - Lucky Street
 2014 - Hobart Jones
 2013 - Ms Funovits
 2012 - Luke's Luck
 2011 - Night War
 2010 - Motion Pictures
 2009 - Gold Rocks
 2008 - Brava Fortune
 2007 - Roman Time
 2006 - Canny Jack
 2005 - No Questions
 2004 - Redwoldt
 2003 - Diffraction
 2002 - Confront
 2001 - Born Priceless
 2000 - Metal Master
 1999 - Climb The Vine
 1998 - Bomber Bill
 1997 - ¶Umah
 1996 - Alabama Whirly
 1995 - Daney Boy
 1994 - Jacks Or Better
 1993 - ‡race not held 
 1992 - Dynamic Beau
 1991 - Lady Kariba
 1990 - Umatilla
 1989 - Highpak
 1988 - Hold That Smile
 1987 - Parlez Doux
 1986 - Golden Unicorn
 1985 - Blue Kristy
 1984 - Vain Marceau
 1983 - Scornvale
 1982 - Top Post
 1981 - Cheeky Trot
 1980 - Anyone Home
 1979 - Oaksana Boy
 1978 - Elegant Shell
 1977 - Rare Sovereign
 1976 - Burgess Queen
 1975 - Bodega
 1974 - Super Red
 1973 - Vain Prince
 1972 - Miss Sunnytime
 1971 - Solid Gold
 1970 - Sans Sabre
 1969 - Tricr
 1968 - Par Avion
 1967 - La Trice
 1966 - Aquatic Star
 1965 - Haze
 1964 - Nanna Tale
 1963 - Little Roderick
 1962 - Son O' Minx
 1961 - Astra Vista
 1960 - Carol Vista
 1959 - Autumn Vista
 1958 - Queen Of The Nile
 1957 - Spherical
 1956 - Sanvista
 1955 - Lady Orator
 1954 - Hyperical
 1953 - Cunderdin
 1952 - Tangle
 1951 - Copper Beech
 1950 - Count Cimbrone
 1949 - Fawzia
 1948 - Nanette
 1947 - Barlowerie
 1946 - Churinga
 1945 - Mayette
 1945 - Beauperian
 1944 - Dream Valley
 1943 - race not held
 1942 - Sky Borne
 1941 - Jean James
 1940 - Ruby
 1939 - Romanette
 1938 - Loyalist
 1937 - Beaufiler
 1936 - Gay Balkan
 1935 - Casey
 1934 - Modulus
 1933 - Gay Gipsy
 1932 - Esmeroic
 1931 - Riveret
 1930 - Chiliad
 1929 - Gallant Airman
 1928 - Three Stripes
 1927 - Dawn Of Youth
 1926 - Chrysene
 1925 - Kongoni
 1924 - Jolly Odd
 1923 - Lace Girl
 1922 - †His Double / Honneur
 1921 - Yanda
 1920 - Easingwold
 1919 - Mount Prophecy
 1918 - Eurythmic
 1917 - Eudios
 1916 - Green Lord
 1915 - Bardeur
 1914 - Welkin Queen
 1913 - Hathor
 1912 - Lucky Beggar
 1911 - Miss Bob
 1910 - Mousme
 1909 - Louvima
 1908 - Jolly Beggar
 1908 - Blue Moon
 1907 - Thorina
 1906 - Romulus
 1905 - Simelle
 1904 - Betsy Burke
 1903 - Hurley Burley
 1902 - San Toy
 1901 - race not held
 1900 - Willie 

¶ The race was run in December 1996 as part of the 1996–97 racing season.
‡ Race moved in the WATC racing calendar forward from summer (December) to late summer (February) of 1994
† Dead heat

See also

 List of Australian Group races
 Group races

References

Horse races in Australia
Sport in Perth, Western Australia